Dos Puntas is a volcano in Chile. A lava flow on the northern flank was dated 2 mya.

References

Volcanoes of Chile